Jonesville may refer to the following places in the U.S. state of Kentucky:
Jonesville, Grant County, Kentucky
Jonesville, Hart County, Kentucky